In J. R. R. Tolkien's fantasy The Lord of the Rings, Old Man Willow is a malign tree-spirit of great age in Tom Bombadil's Old Forest, appearing physically as a large willow tree beside the River Withywindle, but spreading his influence throughout the forest. He is the first hostile character encountered by the Hobbits after they leave the Shire. 

Tolkien made a drawing of Old Man Willow while writing the chapter about him; his son Christopher suggests it was based on a tree by the River Cherwell at Oxford. A predatory tree appears in a 1934 poem, but Tolkien did not arrive at the malevolent Old Man Willow, both tree and spirit, for some years. Scholars have debated the nature of the tree; some have been surprised by it, as Tolkien is seen as an environmentalist. The character was omitted by both Ralph Bakshi and Peter Jackson from their film versions of The Lord of the Rings.

Context

The protagonist Frodo Baggins and his Hobbit companions Sam Gamgee and Pippin Took set out from his home at Hobbiton in the Shire. They are pursued by mysterious Black Riders. They travel eastwards and cross the Bucklebury Ferry over the Brandywine River, meeting their friend Merry Brandybuck. They rest briefly in Buckland, deciding to shake off the Black Riders by cutting through the Old Forest.

Old Man Willow first appeared in Tolkien's poem "The Adventures of Tom Bombadil", published in 1934 in The Oxford Magazine.

Character

Old Man Willow is a malign tree-spirit of great age in Tom Bombadil's Old Forest, appearing physically as a large willow tree beside the River Withywindle, but spreading his influence throughout the forest. As Tolkien explains in the narrative of The Lord of the Rings:

Narrative

In the story, Old Man Willow casts a spell on the hobbits, causing them to feel sleepy. Merry and Pippin lean against the trunk of the willow and fall asleep, while Frodo sits on a root to dangle his feet in the water, before he also falls asleep. The willow then traps Merry and Pippin in the cracks of its trunk and tips Frodo into the stream, but the latter is saved by Sam, who, suspicious of the tree, manages to remain awake. After Frodo and Sam start a fire out of dry leaves, grass, and bits of bark in an attempt to frighten the tree, Merry shouts from the inside to put the fire out because the tree says it is going to squeeze them to death. They are saved by the arrival of Tom Bombadil who sings to the ancient tree to release Merry and Pippin. The tree then ejects the two hobbits. Once they are safely in his house, Bombadil explains to the hobbits that the "Great Willow" is wholly evil, and has gradually spread his domination across the Old Forest until almost all the trees from the Hedge to the Barrow-downs are under his control.

Drawing

Tolkien made a careful pencil and coloured pencil drawing of Old Man Willow while he was writing the chapter "The Old Forest"; Wayne Hammond and Christina Scull call it "a fine example" of the drawings he made to support his creative writing. They note that "with a little imagination" a face can just be made out on the right-hand side of the tree above the arm-like branch. Tolkien describes it as a "huge willow-tree, old and hoary"; to the hobbits it seemed enormous, though Hammond and Scull observe that it does not seem so in the drawing. Tolkien's son John suggests that it was based on one of the few unpollarded willows on the River Cherwell at Oxford.

Interpretations

The Tolkien scholar Verlyn Flieger writes that Old Man Willow first appears as "a predatory tree" in the 1934 poem "The Adventures of Tom Bombadil", and that the character is developed in The Lord of the Rings, as documented in The Return of the Shadow. In an early draft from 1938, she writes, the "Willow" tree and the "Old Man" character had not yet become a single "indivisible being". Instead, Tolkien writes of "how that grey thirsty earth-bound spirit had become imprisoned in the greatest Willow of the Forest." Flieger writes that in this draft and in the 1943 "Manuscript B", Tolkien links "a tree and a spirit, a 'non-incarnate mind'" which is "imprisoned" in an individual tree. She comments that Tolkien solved the problem of how a spirit might become trapped in this way by turning them into a single being, at once a tree and a spirit.

Saguaro and Thacker comment that critics have puzzled over Tolkien's description of Old Man Willow, as it does not fit with Tolkien's image as an environmentalist "tree-hugger". They write that trees (like other creatures in Tolkien's world) are subject to the corruption of the Fall of Man, mentioning Tolkien's Catholicism. They state that while Tolkien's writings on the meaning of trees verges on the pagan, both the Old and the New Testament use trees as symbols – the Tree of Knowledge of Good and Evil in the Book of Genesis, the cross, the tree of death in the Gospels, and the Tree of Life in Revelation (22:2). In their view, Tolkien succeeds in "bring[ing] all these elements together" in The Lord of the Rings: death, creation, sub-creation, re-creation. Dickerson writes that Old Man Willow indicates both that nature, like Man, is fallen, and that it is actively hostile to Man. The Tolkien critic Jared Lobdell compares the "treachery of natural things in an animate world" seen in the character of Old Man Willow to Algernon Blackwood's story "The Willows".

Paul H. Kocher writes that it is unclear whether the tree's malice derives from the Dark Lord Sauron, or is simply the tree's own "natural hatred for destructive mankind", and notes that the hostility extends to all travellers, "innocent and guilty alike".

The scholar of literature James Obertino comments that "'Every obstacle that arises' in the hero's path 'wears the shadowy features of the Terrible Mother'", who in Aeneas's case is the goddess Juno, in Frodo's "the darkness that is Old Man Willow", along with that of the Barrow-wight and Moria. Obertino likens Frodo's encounters with these darknesses to catabasis, the descent into an underworld, complete with psychological interpretations of personal development, of a hero such as Virgil's Aeneas. He adds that Frodo initially finds comfort in the darkness, "in danger of succumbing to the charm of uroboric incest", as he slumbers beside Old Man Willow, and again in the Barrow-wight's deathly dwelling-place.

E. L. Risden states that the elimination of the Ring and Sauron along with his servants the Ringwraiths and Saruman removed the most powerful sources of evil in the world. Others like Old Man Willow were not removed, "but they too will now fade into quietness. The remaining world, blander, has more narrowly circumscribed limits."

Adaptations: appearing or disappearing 

Old Man Willow, like the Old Forest and Tom Bombadil, was not included in Peter Jackson's films of The Lord of the Rings. Justifying the excision, Jackson asked rhetorically in From Book to Script "So, you know, what does Old Man Willow contribute to the story of Frodo carrying the Ring? ... it's not really advancing our story & it's not really telling us things that we need to know." Of the earlier adaptations, Terence Tiller's 1955–1956 radio play did include Old Man Willow and Bombadil, though no recording survives. Morton Zimmerman's unproduced 1957 highly-compressed script, criticised by Tolkien for rushing rather than cutting, similarly included them: Bombadil takes the hobbits straight from Old Man Willow to the Barrow-downs, all the action in the episode seemingly occurring in one day. John Boorman's unproduced c. 1970 script did not include them; the hobbits "getting high on mushrooms" instead. Ralph Bakshi's 1978 animated film omits the Old Forest altogether, setting a precedent for Jackson. Although the hobbits do not pass through the Old Forest in Jackson's film of The Fellowship of the Ring, the map shown on screen earlier in the film does include Buckland, the Old Forest, and the Barrow-downs; however, in the extended edition DVD of The Two Towers, the Ent Treebeard speaks a version of Bombadil's unlocking words to Old Man Willow in Fangorn Forest, so, argues John D. Rateliff, as far as Jackson was concerned there can have been no Old Man Willow in the mapped Old Forest, and no Bombadil, as the action takes place elsewhere. Old Man Willow however does appear in the Old Forest in the 1991 Soviet television play Khraniteli, where he traps two of the hobbits.

Notes

References

Primary 
This list identifies each item's location in Tolkien's writings.

Secondary

Sources 

 

Fictional trees
Middle-earth characters
Middle-earth monsters